This is a list of players who have played at least one game for the Cincinnati Stingers of the World Hockey Association from 1975–76 to 1978–79.



A
Bruce Abbey,
Dennis Abgrall,
Jeff Allan,
Steve Andrascik,
Serge Aubry

B
Terry Ball,
Bryon Baltimore,
Frank Beaton,
Serge Beaudoin,
Mike Byers

C
Bryan Campbell,
Jacques Caron,
Greg Carroll,
Gordie Clark,
Brian Coates,
Rich Coutu

D
Kelly Davis,
Butch Deadmarsh,
Dave Debol,
Michel Dion,
Pat Donnelly,
Dave Dornseif,
Rick Dudley

F
Dave Forbes,
Robbie Ftorek

G
Mike Gartner,
Ed Gilbert,
Bill Gilligan,
Bruce Greig,
Pierre Guite

H
Del Hall,
Alf Handrahan,
Hugh Harris,
Jamie Hislop,
Paul Hoganson,
John Hughes

I
Dave Inkpen

J
Dan Justin

K
John Kiely

L
Floyd Lahache,
Normand LaPointe,
Claude Larose,
Rich Leduc,
Barry Legge,
Mike Liut,
Jacques Locas,
Ted Long,
Chuck Luksa

M
Bernie MacNeil,
Darryl Maggs,
Gilles Marotte,
Peter Marsh,
Bryan Maxwell,
John McKenzie,
Gerry Meehan,
Barry Melrose,
Mark Messier,
Murray Myers

N
Craig Norwich

O
Don O'Donoghue,
Francois Ouimet

P
Michel Parizeau,
Mike Pelyk,
Ron Plumb

R
Pierre Roy

S
Ron Serafini,
Sean Shanahan,
Byron Shutt,
Dale Smedsmo,
Dennis Sobchuk,
Gene Sobchuk,
Claude St. Sauveur,
Pat Stapleton,
Bill Steele,
Paul Stewart,
Blaine Stoughton

T
Reg Thomas,
Willie Trognitz

V
Gary Veneruzzo

W
Ernie Wakely,
Bryan Watson

References
Cincinnati Stingers (WHA) all-time player roster at hockeydb.com

  
Cincinnati Stingers
Stingers
Cincinnati Stingers players